The Heinkel HD 33 was a scout bomber developed by Ernst Heinkel Flugzeugwerke.

Development 
The HD 33 was a two-seat biplane powered by an Armstrong Siddeley Puma inline engine. It first flew in 1928 but initial flight tests showed disappointing aircraft, so the plane was returned to its manufacturer and fitted with a BMW VI engine as well as a new radiator, thus being redesignated HD 33a. After flight tests in this new configuration, the aircraft was to be transferred to the flight test center in Lipitsk, but the German military abandoned the idea and the HD.33 remained a prototype only. Plans for a civilian version never materialized.

Specifications (HD 33a)

References

1920s German bomber aircraft
HD 33
Single-engined tractor aircraft
Biplanes
Aircraft first flown in 1925